The Cambridge movement was an American social movement in Dorchester County, Maryland, led by Gloria Richardson and the Cambridge Nonviolent Action Committee. Protests continued from late 1961 to the summer of 1964. The movement led to the desegregation of all schools, recreational areas, and hospitals in Maryland and the longest period of martial law within the United States since 1877. Many cite it as the birth of the Black Power movement.

Background
Black residents of Cambridge had the right to vote, but were still discriminated against and lacked economic opportunities. Their homes did not have plumbing, some even living in "chicken shacks." And since the local segregated hospitals were white, Black residents had to drive two hours to Baltimore for medical care. They had the highest rates of unemployment. The Black unemployment rate was four times higher than that of whites. The only two local factories, both defense contractors, had agreed not to hire any Black workers, as long as the whites agreed not to unionize. All venues of entertainment, churches, cafes, and schools were segregated. Black schools received half as much funding as whites. Even though a third of Cambridge's residents were Black, there were only three black police officers. These police officers could not patrol white neighborhoods or arrest white people.

The movement

Initial protests
On Christmas Eve of 1961, Student Nonviolent Coordinating Committee Field Secretaries Reggie Robinson and Bill Hansen arrived and began organizing student protests. Additionally, the Cambridge Movement, much like Freedom Summer, placed significant emphasis on voter education drives, but there were some differences. In Cambridge, local whites did not react as violently to increased Black voter registration as they did in Mississippi. In fact, some white moderates actually advocated for voter registration, as they viewed it as better than the alternative of direct action protests in the streets and in public facilities. Also, Black voter registration did not threaten the white majority like in the Black Belt in the American South.  In 1962, the Cambridge Nonviolent Action Committee, (CNAC), was organized to run these protests. Gloria Richardson and Inez Grubb both became the co-chairs of the CNAC. It was the only affiliate of SNCC that was not student-led. The CNAC began picketing any business which refused to hire Black people. They conducted sit-ins at lunch-counters which would not serve Black people. White mobs often disrupted protests such as these. Protests on Race Street, which separated the Black and white communities, often became violent. Cleveland Sellers, who was a SNCC Field Secretary, later said, "By the time we got to town, Cambridge’s Black people had stopped extolling the virtues of passive resistance. Guns were carried as a matter of course and it was understood that they would be used." Richardson defended such actions by Black people: "Self-defense may actually be a deterrent to further violence. Hitherto, the government has moved into conflict situations only when matters approach the level of insurrection." In the spring of 1963, over a period of seven weeks, Richardson and 80 other protesters were arrested. Tensions rose steadily and by June, Black people were rioting in the street. Maryland Governor J. Millard Tawes met with the protesters at a local school. He offered to accelerate school desegregation, build public housing, and establish a biracial commission if they only cease the protests. The CNAC rejected the deal, and in response, he declared martial law and sent the National Guard to Cambridge.

Treaty of Cambridge
Possible violence close to the U.S. capitol brought Cambridge to the attention of the Kennedy Administration. Attorney General Robert F. Kennedy began holding discussions with the CNAC. They, and the local city government, reached an agreement which would prevent possible violence. It would also desegregate public facilities, create provisions for public housing, and establish a human rights committee. It was called the "Treaty of Cambridge." But the agreement soon fell through as the local government demanded that it be passed by a local referendum.

George Wallace
In May 1964, George Wallace, the segregationist Governor of Alabama, arrived in Cambridge to give a campaign speech. He had been invited by the DBCA, the city's primary business association. Black protesters soon appeared to protest his appearance and a riot occurred.

Aftermath
Once the Civil Rights Act of 1964 was passed by Congress, the movement lost all momentum. The federal government had mandated everything that the CNAC had been fighting for. As protests ended, the National Guard withdrew. Gloria Richardson resigned from the CNAC and moved to New York City.

See also

 Pine Street Neighborhood Historic District

References

Further reading

Encyclopedias

Scholarly monographs

Dissertations and theses

Autobiographies and memoirs

Journals

Newspapers

Non-academic works

External links

General
 Gloria St. Clair Hayes Richardson  Interview recording form Robert Penn Warren Center for the Humanities. Retrieved February 1, 2019.
 H. Rap Brown Cambridge, Maryland speech on July 24, 1967  Provided by Maryland State Archives.  Retrieved February 1, 2019.

Audio and video
  - 4:14 minutes.
 

Images
 
 CORE Route 40 Campaign Flyer Provided by CRM Veterans website.  Retrieved February 1, 2019.
 Getty Images  Images of Gloria Richardson and Cambridge, Maryland during Civil Rights Movement.  Retrieved February 1, 2019.
 

1961 in Maryland
1962 in Maryland
1963 in Maryland
1964 in Maryland
1965 in Maryland
1966 in Maryland
1967 in Maryland
Civil rights movement
African-American history in Cambridge, Maryland
African-American history of Maryland
Cambridge, Maryland
Civil rights protests in the United States
Conflicts in 1961
Conflicts in 1962
Conflicts in 1963
Conflicts in 1964
Conflicts in 1965
Conflicts in 1966
Conflicts in 1967
History of African-American civil rights
History of Maryland
Movements for civil rights
Protest marches